Three in One is a 1957 Australian anthology film directed by Cecil Holmes and starring Reg Lye. It consists of three separate stories, "A Load of Wood", "The City", and "Joe Wilson's Mates".

Plot
In Joe Wilson's Mates, Joe Wilson dies alone in a small town during the 1890s without friend or family. But because he carries a union card the local union member give him a decent burial.

The Load of Wood is set during the 1930s. Two men are doing relief work but can not afford to buy enough fuel to keep their families warm. They steal a truck of wood from a rich man's estate and distribute it around to need families.

In The City a young factory worker and ship assistant plan to marry but cannot afford it. The argue an walk the streets but realise they love each other.

Cast

Joe Wilson's Mates
 Reg Lye as the swaggie
Edmund Allison as Tom Stevens
Alexander Archdale as Firbank
Charles Tasman as the undertaker
Don McNiven as Patrick Rooney
Jerold Wells as Wally
Chris Kempster as Longun
Brian Anderson as Joe
Kenneth Warren as Andy
Evelyn Docker as Maggie
Ben Gabriel as the priest
the Bushwacker's Band

The Load of Wood
Jock Levy as Darkie
Leonard Thiele as Ernie
Ossie Wenban as Sniffy
John Armstrong as Chilla
Jim Doone as Joe
Ted Smith as Coulson
Edward Lovell as The
Keith Howard as Shea
Eileen Ryan as Mrs Johnson

The City
Joan Landor as Kathie
Brian Vicary as Ted
Betty Lucas as Freda
Gordon Glenwright as Alex
Ken Wayne as first cab driver
Stewart Ginn as second cab driver
Alan Trevor as preacher
PatMartin as customer
Margaret Christensen as customer
Alastair Roberts as bodgie

Production
Filming for tall three stories took place at Pagewood Studios before and after Smiley was shot there in 1955. Exteriors for the first two stories were shot in Camden and locations for the third were filmed on Sydney streets.

Reception
The film was positively received by overseas critics and screened at a number of festivals (including one in Communist China) but struggled to obtain commercial release in Australia. It failed to recover its cost and Australian Tradition Films was liquidated in 1959.

References

External links
Three in One in the Internet Movie Database
Three in One at Oz Movies
 'Three in One' at Cinema Reborn 2021

1957 films
Australian drama films
1950s English-language films
Australian anthology films